Wen Shaoxian, born 4 December 1934) also known as Wan Siu Yin is a literary writer, famous for his short stories about the lives of the new immigrants from the mainland in Hong Kong. He is expert in writing political and historical novels. Wen is a translator and editor by profession and is also a professor of translation and comparative grammar.

Biography
Wen was born in Hong Kong in an intellectual family. His father was a schoolmaster all his life. When Hong Kong was occupied by the Japanese invaders in 1941, his family had to flee Hong Kong and go back to their ancestral home in Qingyuan County, Guangdong Province, where his mother died of typhoid fever some time later. In the several years that followed, the family led a poor and unstable life there. After the war, Wen and his elder brother came back to Hong Kong to live with their grandmother who was the chief cook of an English taipan family. In 1954, he was admitted to Sun Yat-sen University in Guangzhou, China, majoring in English language and literature. Upon his graduation in 1958, he was assigned to do odd jobs in a remote mountainous area in Guangxi Province . He was transferred to the Department of Foreign Languages of Guangxi University in 1961. He had successively held the posts of assistant, lecturer and deputy director of the English teaching and researching section there. He was allowed to come back to Hong Kong in 1978.

After he returned to Hong Kong, Wen had served successively as translator, translation copy editor and chief editor in a number of established translation or publishing companies. The number of books he translated and copy-edited amounted to over one hundred. He has been engaged in the study of Chinese-English contrastive grammar and translation for more than three decades. So far he has published nine academic books and a number of theses in this connection. Besides, he has held the post of honorary professor at Sias International University affiliated to Zhengzhou University in Henan Province, China since 2001.

Wen has been engaged in literary work for more than half a century. His literary works include ten novels, three collections of short stories and two biographies. His short stories, characterized by their "unexpected ending," were well received by the readers both in Hong Kong and in mainland China. His New Immigrants, a collection of short stories published in Beijing in 1987, was a best seller in the mainland. Wen's novel Fragrant Port trilogy was published in Beijing in 2000 by the Writers Publishing House, one of the two top literary publishing institutions in China. The Literary Gazette, a very famous literary critical publication in Beijing, regarded it as "a masterpiece faithfully reflecting the vicissitudes of fortune Hong Kong had experienced over the past one hundred years." Of his ten novels, nine have been translated into English, of which the author translated eight and copied-edited the other one. They were published in e-book edition by Everflow Publications in Hong Kong in March and May 2011 respectively and are distributed and sold by Amazon Digital Services, USA.

Wen had spent fifteen years in writing his Fruitless Flowers, a novel series. It consists of five books which were published in Hong Kong in 1987 and 1992 successively. It brings to light for the first time in the form of literature the complete process of all the major political movements waged by Mao Zedong during his 27-year rule over China, along with one tragic story after another taking place during that period. Professor Yuan Liangjun, research fellow with the Institute of Literature under the Chinese Academy of Social Sciences, wrote in his work 《香港小說流派史》 (History of Different Schools of Fiction in Hong Kong), "Fruitless Flowers is the only novel series so far portraying the ultra-Left errors in China during the 1950s, 1960s and 1970s. With its grand boldness of vision and very true-to-life settings, the novel series profoundly reflects the tragic history of that period." Tung Rui, a well-known writer in Hong Kong and overseas, said in his article 《溫紹賢系列長篇的成功》 (Wen Shaoxian's Novel Series Is a Success) (published in Literary Free Talk, a very well-known literary review magazine in China, in its issue 2, 1992): "Fruitless Flowers novel series by Wen Shaoxian, has a great and inestimable significance... Fruitless Flowers novel series is a literary work with an epical structure. It serves as a telling witness to the part of tragic history in China. Its value of existence allows of no doubt no matter what its gain or loss would be… Its literary value is sure to coexist with history." Under the new title of Red Memories pentalogy, its one volume revised edition was published in Hong Kong in 2008. Soon it was permanently collected as a rare book by the National Museum of Modern Chinese Literature in Beijing, the most authoritative modern Chinese literature institution in China.

Bibliography

Literary works

Academic Works

Comments on Wen's Works

Part of Wen's Translation Works

E to C
The Biography of De Gaulle (copy editor, Beijing People's Publishing House, 1978) 
The Ocean's Mysteries (Ming Tin Publishing Co., Hong Kong, 1981)
The Joy of Sex (co-translator, Blue Bird Publications, Hong Kong, 1981)
Introducing Computers (Blue Bird Publications, Hong Kong, 1982)
The Ancestor Halls in the New Territory (Blue Bird Publications, Hong Kong, 1983)
The Crystal Skull (co-translator, Wan Li Book Co., Ltd., Hong Kong, 1983) 
Harrap's Drive in English (Harrap, London, 1983) 
The Sicilian Contract (co-translator, Sun Ya Publications (HK) Ltd. 1985) 
The Tomb of Amenois (co-translator, Sun Ya Publications (HK) Ltd. 1985) 
The Kama Sutra (Chinese Canadian Daily, Canada, 1985) 
The Koka Shastra (Chinese Canadian Daily, Canada, 1986)
Sex in History (Unicorn Books Limited, Hong Kong, 1990)
Mystery of Sexy (Holdery Publishing Enterprises Ltd., Hong Kong, 1991)
Mix and Match Designer's Colours (Art Distribution Centre Ltd., Hong Kong, 1993)
How to Check and Correct Colour Proofs (Art Distribution Centre Ltd., 1993)
QuarkXPress: A Visual Guide for the Mac (copy editor, Art Distribution Centre Ltd., 1994)
Information Illustration (copy editor, Art Distribution Centre Ltd., Hong Kong, 1994)
Illustration Software on the Mac (copy editor, Art Distribution Centre Ltd., Hong Kong, 1995)
Animation and 3D Modeling on the Mac (copy editor, Art Distribution Centre Ltd., 1995)
Pro-Lighting: Exquisite Shots (copy editor, Art Distribution Centre Ltd., Hong Kong, 1995)
Pro-Lighting: Product Shots (copy editor, Art Distribution Centre Ltd., Hong Kong, 1995)
Adobe Photoshop: A Visual Guide for the Mac (copy editor, Art Distribution Centre Ltd., 1996)
Computer Animation Production (copy editor, Art Distribution Centre Ltd., Hong Kong, 1996)
Pro-Lighting: Special Effects (copy editor, Art Distribution Centre Ltd., Hong Kong, 1996)
Pro-Lighting: Interior Shots (copy editor, Art Distribution Centre Lid., Hong Kong, 1966)
Pro-Lighting: Lingerie Shots (copy editor, Art Distribution Centre Ltd., Hong Kong, 1996)
Digital Image Creation – Sights into the New Photography (copy editor, Art Distribution Centre Ltd., Hong Kong, 1996)
Physics Textbooks for Secondary School Students, 14 books (co-translator, published in Hong Kong in 2001 – 2007)

C to E
Sino-Vietnamese War (Kingsway International Publications Ltd., Hong Kong, 1981)
Shaolin Gungfu (Kingsway International Publications Ltd., Hong Kong, 1981)
The Story of Dayu (Kingsway International Publications Ltd., Hong Kong, 1982)
Law Annual Report of China 1982/83 (Kingsway International Publications Ltd., 1982)
Laws and Regulations of the PRC (volume I) (Kingsway International Publications Ltd., 1982)
Laws and Regulations of the PRC (volume II) (Hong Kong Cultural Company, 1984)
Album of Paintings of chairman Mao Memorial Hall (Xinhua Publishing House, Beijing, 1993)
Selected Photos of Deng Xiaoping during his Southern Tour (Guangdong People’s Publishing House, 1983)
New Looks of Qingxin Municipality (Qingxin City, Guangdong Province, 1993)
Tearful Youth](copy editor, novel, e-book edition, published by Everflow Publications, Hong Kong, March 2011)
Rainbow Bridge (novel, e-book edition, published by Everflow Publications, Hong Kong, March 2011)
Withered Flowers (novel, e-book edition, published by Everflow Publications, Hong Kong, March 2011)
Awful Catastrophe (novel, e-book edition, published by Everflow Publications, Hong Kong, March 2011)
Generation Lost (novel, e-book edition, published by Everflow Publications, Hong Kong, March 2011)
Path Finder  (Fragrant Port trilogy, book 1, novel, e-book edition, published by Everflow Publications, Hong Kong, May 2011)
Working Wonders (Fragrant Port trilogy, book 2, novel, e-book edition, published by Everflow Publications, Hong Kong, May 2011)
Fragrant Forever (Fragrant Port trilogy, book 3, novel, e-book edition, published by Everflow Publications, Hong Kong, May 2011)
Dear Pursuit (novel, e-book edition, published by Everflow Publications, Hong Kong, March 2011)
An Active Modern Chinese Grammar & Translation (English version, e-book edition) (Everflow Publications, July 2011)
Useful Chinese Words & Expressions Book One (English version) (Everflow Publications, March 2013) 
Useful Chinese Words & Expressions Book Two (English version) (Everflow Publications, March 2013)
Useful Chinese Words & Expressions Book Three (English version) (Everflow Publications, March 2013)
Chinese-English Comparative Studies (e-book version) (Everflow Publications, December, 2013)
Red Memories pentalogy (e-book version) (Everflow Publications, December, 2013)
Romance of the Fragrant Port trilogy (e-book version) (Everflow Publications, December, 2013)
Essentials of Modern Chinese (e-book version) (Everflow Publications, April, 2014)
Steps to Elegant Translation from E to C (e-book version) (Everflow Publications, June, 2014)
Chinese Sentence Patterns (classified) (e-book version) (Everflow Publications, June, 2014)
Chinese Numerals and Classifiers (e-book version) (Everflow Publications, Aug. 2014)
Moonlight Island (Popular Science Press, Beijing, Aug. 2014)
The Magic Flute of Tianjialin (Popular Science Press, Beijing, Aug. 2014)
Dear Delusion (Popular Science Press, Beijing, Aug. 2014)
The New Noah’s Ark (Popular Science Press, Beijing, Aug. 2014)

References
 Humor and Smile through Tears – Preface to AN OLD PROMISE (Wen Wei Po, Literary Page, Hong Kong, issue 536, 21 August 1988)
I Have No Engagement in the Literary Circles (carried in Hong Kong Writers, issue 56, 15 May 1995)
Brief Biographies of Hong Kong Literary Writers (Hong Kong Public Libraries, Hong Kong Urban Council, August 1996)
Biographical Sketches of Hong Kong Writers (Hong Kong Writers Publishing House, November 1997)
The Preface to FRAGRANT PORT trilogy (The Writers Publishing House, Beijing, January 2000)
History of Different Schools of Fiction in Hong Kong (Fujian People’s Publishing House, China, January 2008)
The General Preface to RED MEMORIES pentalogy (Everflow Publications, Hong Kong, September 2008)

External links
Biographical notes of Hong Kong writers at www.hkauthors.com.hk
Manuscripts of Hong Kong famous writers at Hong Kong Central Library
Chinese authors at www.cbi.gov.cn
Famous Chinese translators at www.cbi.gov.cn
Wen’s works sold at Handheld Culture, Hong Kong
Wen’s novels in English edition sold at Amazon Digital Services, USA
Some of Wen's works in libraries (Classify catalog)
Article about Fragrant Port trilogy – 作聯二十周年系列—— 曾敏之︰香港作聯邁向文學新里程, HKWriter, 24 November 2008
Wen Shaoxian's Novel Series Is a Success 《溫紹賢系列長篇的成功》, Literary Free Talk magazine, Tianjin, China, Issue 2, 1992
History of Different Schools of Fiction in Hong Kong 《香港小说流派史》, Fujian People's Publishing House, China, January 2008

1934 births
Living people
20th-century Chinese translators
21st-century Chinese translators
Chinese technology writers
Academic staff of Guangxi University
Han Chinese people
Hong Kong editors
Hong Kong educators
Hong Kong novelists
People's Republic of China translators